Home is the eighth studio album by Keller Williams. Home centers on his love for his hometown of Fredericksburg, Virginia and contains audio clips from his childhood within the songs.

The album peaked at #39 on Billboards Independent Albums chart in 2003.

Track listing
 Love Handles 3:07
 Apparition 4:35
 Tubeular 3:34
 Victory Song 3:56
 Butt Ass Nipple 1:48
 Dogs 5:18
 Skitso 3:16
 Moving Sidewalk 3:48
 Sheebs 3:25
 Above the Thunder 5:42
 Art 3:10
 Casa Quetzal 3:50
 Bitch Monkey 3:58
 You Are What You Eat 6:01
 Zilla 1:43
 Sorry From the Shower 7:48

Personnel
Danny Clinch – inside jacket front photo (Keller on chair tilted)
Jeff Covert – engineer, mixing
Neil Glancy – design, package concept
Louis Gosain – engineer
Bo Hubbard – cover photo
Diana Keeton – photography
Josh Keeton – photography
Keller's Mom – photography
Charlie Pilzer – mastering
Keller Williams – organ, acoustic guitar, bass, Dobro, percussion, piano, drums, electric guitar, vocals, voices, Djembe, guitar synth, instrumentation

References

2003 albums
Keller Williams albums